BC Sūduva known as Sūduva-Mantinga for sponsorship reasons, is a professional basketball club based in Marijampolė, Lithuania. Sūduva formerly participated in the LKL. On 16 September 2010 Sūduva basketball club was removed from the LKL because of financial problems. The club currently competes in the second-tier NKL.
The club was named after Suvalkija, an ethnographic region of Lithuania, of which Marijampolė is considered capital.

History
Marijampolė basketball club "Mantinga" was founded in 2007. The club aims to develop and promote basketball in Marijampolė, promote the formation of wellness and physical development, unite members for physical activity, healthy lifestyles, physical culture, enable Marijampolė residents to systematically engage in basketball, promote social employment, mutual communication, and cooperation, promote a healthy and active lifestyle, represent members and defend their interests, provide a wide range of information and assistance.

The team was called "Mantinga − ŽSM" for the first two seasons and successfully competed in RKL, showing better results every year. In the 2010-2011 season, the team successfully won the Small Cup of the Regional Basketball League.

In 2011, the team changed the name and became "Sūduva" and started playing in NKL. The debut was successful, Sūduva was one victory from reaching NKL Final Four. Marijampolė municipality contributed to the team's sponsors.

Players

Current roster

Season by season

 Cancelled due to the COVID-19 pandemic in Europe.

Head coaches
  Povilas Šakinis: 2019–2021
  Marius Kiltinavičius: 2021–present

References 

Marijampole
Sport in Marijampolė
Basketball teams established in 2006
2006 establishments in Lithuania
National Basketball League (Lithuania) teams